, also known as Ichiyūsai Hirokage, was a Japanese designer of ukiyo-e woodblock prints, who was active from about 1855 to 1865. He was a pupil of Utagawa Hiroshige I. From 1860 to 1861, Hirokage designed the series of ōban size prints titled Edo meisho dōke zukushi (Joyful Events in Famous Places in Edo). His reputation is based primarily upon this series and his 1859 triptych  (The Great Battle between the Fruits and Vegetables and the Fish).

Gallery

References

 Lane, Richard. (1978).  Images from the Floating World, The Japanese Print. Oxford: Oxford University Press. ;  OCLC 5246796
 Newland, Amy Reigle. (2005). Hotei Encyclopedia of Japanese Woodblock Prints.  Amsterdam: Hotei. ;  OCLC 61666175 

Hirokage